Miguel Ângelo Freitas Barbosa, known as Miguel Barbosa (born 16 October 1996), is a Portuguese football defender who plays for FK Sloboda Užice in the Serbian First League.

Club career
Born in Funchal, the capital of Madeira islands, a Portuguese autonomous region, Miguel Barbosa begin playing in 2007 in the youth team of local side C.D. Nacional. Two years later, he moved to their rivals, C.S. Marítimo, where he played in their youth team until 2015, with a minor exception of a one season spell at youth team of C.D. Barreirense in 2011–12. He was upgraded to the senior team in 2015, and included in the C.S. Marítimo B team which played in the 2015–16 Campeonato de Portugal. That season he also made 22 appearances and scored 9 goals for C.S. Marítimo C. He played for Marítimo C the following two seasons as well. He had a highlight when, on May 12, 2018, he scored a hat-trick in the final of the Cup of Madeira which Marítimo C won by 3–2 against A.D. Pontassolense.

In summer 2018, he decided to take a chance abroad, and, after a suceessfull trial period, he signed with Serbian club FK Sloboda Užice. He made a debut in the 2018–19 Serbian First League on September 18, 2018, in a home defeat against FK Zlatibor Čajetina by 0–3.

Honours
Marítimo C
Cup of Madeira: 2018

References

1996 births
Living people
Sportspeople from Funchal
Portuguese footballers
Association football defenders
C.S. Marítimo players
FK Sloboda Užice players
Serbian First League players
Portuguese expatriate footballers
Expatriate footballers in Serbia